Gnarosophia bellendenkerensis is a species of air-breathing land snail, a terrestrial pulmonate gastropod mollusk in the family Camaenidae.

Distribution 
This species lives in rainforests in North Queensland, Australia.

The type locality is Bellenden Ker Mountains, Queensland.

Description 
The height of the shell is 33.08 mm. The width of the shell is 40.19 mm.

Ecology 
These snails live in leaf litter or under logs in the mesothermal rainforest.

References

Further reading

External links 

Camaenidae
Gastropods described in 1875
Taxa named by John Brazier